is a Japanese professional wrestler who is currently wrestling in the Independent circuit in Japan. Since debuting in 1993, Ikeda has worked for a number of promotions in Japan, including Battlarts, All Japan Pro Wrestling, Pro Wrestling Noah and Frontier Martial Arts Wrestling (FMW).

Professional wrestling career
Ikeda was trained by Yoshiaki Fujiwara and joined Fujiwara's promotion Fujiwara Gumi in 1993. In 1994, representing Fujiwara Gumi, he fought for Fighting Network RINGS in his only mixed martial arts fight against Tsuyoshi Kosaka in a losing effort. In 1995 he moved to BattlARTS. As one of the few heavyweights competing in a promotion made up mostly of junior heavyweights (compare Jinsei Shinzaki in Michinoku Pro Wrestling), he often had to look out of the promotion for challenges, including Shinzaki and FMW talent such as Hayabusa, Masato Tanaka, and Hiromichi Fuyuki.

In 1998 he started making appearances in All Japan Pro Wrestling, and finally in early 2000 he joined the promotion as a full-time worker. He did not stay long as later that year he left for Mitsuharu Misawa's new promotion Pro Wrestling Noah. He briefly joined Misawa's Wave faction, but left soon after. On June 1, 2004 he beat Takeshi Morishima for the WLW Heavyweight Championship. In December 2004 he announced his departure from Noah. He now wrestles in the Japanese Independent circuit, and runs his own promotion, Fu-Ten Promotion.

Championships and accomplishments
A-Team
WEW World Tag Team Championship (2 times) – with HASEGAWA (1) and Keiichi Sato (1)
Fujiwara Gumi/Battlarts
FMW Brass Knuckles Tag Team Championship (2 times) – with Yoshiaki Fujiwara (1), and Hayabusa (1)
BattlARTS Young Generation Battle League (1999)
WLW
WLW Heavyweight Championship (1 time)
Tokyo Sports
Newcomer Award (1995)

References

Profile at fansite
Profile at Green Destiny

External links
Official Site (Japanese)

Japanese male professional wrestlers
Living people
1968 births
People from Kumamoto Prefecture
20th-century professional wrestlers
21st-century professional wrestlers
FMW Brass Knuckles Tag Team Champions